Sajeev John, OC, FRSC (born 1957) is a Professor of Physics at the University of Toronto and Canada Research Chair holder.

He received his bachelor's degree in physics in 1979 from the Massachusetts Institute of Technology and his Ph.D. in physics at Harvard University in 1984.  His Ph.D. work at Harvard introduced the theory of classical wave localization and, in particular, the localization of light in three-dimensional strongly scattering dielectrics. From 1984–1986 he was a Natural Sciences and Engineering Research Council of Canada postdoctoral fellow at the University of Pennsylvania, as well as a laboratory consultant to the Corporate Research Science Laboratories of Exxon Research and Engineering from 1985-1989.

From 1986-1989 he was an assistant professor of physics at Princeton University. In 1987, while at Princeton he co-invented, along with Eli Yablonovitch, the concept of a new class of materials with a photonic band gap called photonic crystals. This provided a fuller explanation of his original conception (1984) of the localization of light. He was a laboratory consultant to Bell Communications Research (Red Bank, NJ) in 1989.  In the fall of 1989 he joined the senior physics faculty at the University of Toronto. He has been a Principal Investigator for Photonics Research Ontario and is a fellow of the Canadian Institute for Advanced Research.

Professor John is the winner of the 2001 King Faisal International Prize in Science, which he shared with C. N. Yang.  He is also the first ever winner of Canada’s Platinum Medal for Science and Medicine in 2002. Dr. John is the winner of the Institute of Electrical and Electronics Engineers (IEEE) LEOS International Quantum Electronics Award in 2007 for “the invention and development of light-trapping crystals and elucidation of their properties and applications.” He is the 2008 winner of the IEEE Pioneer Award in Nanotechnology and the 2013 IEEE David Sarnoff Award.  In 2011, Prof. John was selected as a Thomson-Reuters Citation Laureate. Recently. Prof. John was awarded the Killam Prize in Natural Sciences for 2014 by the Canada Council for the Arts. In 2017, he was appointed as an Officer of the Order of Canada "For his revolutionary contributions to optical sciences, notably for his role in the development of new structures capable of harnessing the flow of light." In 2021, Prof. John was awarded the Herzberg Canada Gold Medal by the Natural Sciences and Engineering Research Council of Canada.

Dr. John also received the 1996 Herzberg Medal for Physics and the 2007 Brockhouse Medal for Condensed Matter and Materials Physics from the Canadian Association of Physicists. He received the first ever McLean Fellowship from the University of Toronto in 1996, the 1997 Steacie Prize in Science and Engineering from the National Research Council of Canada, and the 2004 Rutherford Medal from the Royal Society of Canada.  He is the first ever winner of Brockhouse Canada Prize in 2004, which he shared with materials chemist Geoffrey Ozin for their groundbreaking interdisciplinary work on photonic band gap materials synthesis.  Professor John has also received the Killam Fellowship of the Canada Council for the Arts, the Guggenheim Fellowship (USA), the Japan Society for the Promotion of Science Fellowship, and the Humboldt Senior Scientist Award (Germany). In 2007, Dr. John was awarded the C.V. Raman Chair Professorship of the Government of India. Prof. John is a Fellow of the American Physical Society, the Optical Society of America, the Royal Society of Canada, and a member of the Max Planck Society of Germany. He was the 2011 Elizabeth R. Laird Lecturer at the Memorial University of Newfoundland.

References

External links
Sajeev John's University of Toronto home page
Why trap light?
Photonic Band Gap Materials: Semiconductors of Light (YouTube)
Photonic Crystals Increase Solar Cell Efficiency (YouTube)

1957 births
Living people
Canadian physicists
Fellows of the Royal Society of Canada
MIT Department of Physics alumni
Harvard University alumni
University of Pennsylvania alumni
Academic staff of the University of Toronto
Canada Research Chairs
Officers of the Order of Canada
Indian emigrants to Canada
Fellows of the American Physical Society
Optical physicists
20th-century Indian physicists
21st-century Indian physicists
Canadian people of Indian descent